Ladilla Rusa is a Spanish musical group formed in 2017 and originally from Montcada i Reixac, which is a municipality of the Province of Barcelona.

History
Tania Lozano and Víctor F. Clares, originally from Moncada y Reixach, friends since childhood and journalists by training, decided in 2017 to create a musical duo, initially as a joke. Their style has influences of electropop, Catalan rumba and other influences from the Barcelona periphery, in what has been dubbed as "charnego pride. They have played at the Sonorama and Arenal Sound festivals.

Discography
Estado del Malestar. La Mundial Records (2018).

References

External links
 Official website

Spanish musical groups